Galliera Veneta is a comune (municipality) in the Province of Padua in the Italian region Veneto, located about  northwest of Venice and about  north of Padua.

Galliera Veneta borders the following municipalities: Cittadella, Loria, Rossano Veneto, San Martino di Lupari, Tombolo.

Demographic evolution

Twin towns
Galliera Veneta is twinned with:

  Carbonne, France
  Jelenje, Croatia

References

Cities and towns in Veneto